Pikal is a surname. Notable people with this surname include: 

Michael J. Pikal (1939–2018), American pharmacologist
Wally Pikal (1927–2017), American musician and entertainer
Wolfgang Pikal (born 1967), Austrian football manager